Jahir a variant of Jair is a given name. It may refer to:

People

Given name
Jahir Barraza (born 1990), Mexican footballer
Jahir Khan, Fijian senior police officer of Indian descent
Jahir Ocampo (born 1990), Mexican diver
Jahir Butrón (born 1975), Peruvian footballer

Surname
Shahidul Jahir (1953–2008), Bangladeshi novelist and short story writer

See also
Jair (name)